The 2011 Spanish Indoor Athletics Championships was the 47th edition of the national championship in indoor track and field for Spain. It was held on 19 and 20 February at the Luis Puig Palace in Valencia

Medal summary

Men

Women

See also
2011 Spanish Athletics Championships

References

Results
47º Campeonato de España Absoluto en Pista Cubierta. RFEA. Retrieved 2019-07-06.

External links 
 Official website of the Royal Spanish Athletics Federation 

2011
Spanish Athletics Championships
Spanish Championships
Athletics Championships
Sports competitions in Valencia